Altoona-style pizza is a distinct type of pizza created in the city of Altoona, Pennsylvania by the Altoona Hotel.  The definitive characteristics of Altoona-style pizza are a Sicilian-style pizza dough, tomato sauce, sliced green bell pepper, salami, topped with American cheese and pizzas cut into squares instead of wedges.

Characteristics and preparation

Crust
The crust is made of a Sicilian-style pizza dough, giving the pie a thick and soft crust. Instead of the larger pie-like wedges typical of many pizza styles, Altoona Hotel pizza is typically cut into squares.

Cheese
While originally topped with Velveeta, Altoona-style pizza is popularly topped with yellow processed cheese known as American cheese. The yellow squares of American cheese are a staple of this dish used instead of the mozzarella or provolone common to other styles of pizza.

Toppings
The traditional toppings included on a slice of Altoona-style pizza are a sliced green bell pepper and cooked deli style salami with peppercorns, notable for being underneath the pizza's cheese topping.

History
Altoona-style pizza originated at the Altoona Hotel, which was noted as serving "a unique pizza" in 1996 by the Pittsburgh Post-Gazette. Following the destruction of the hotel in 2013 by fire, other local restaurants began serving Altoona-style pizza.

References 

Cuisine of Pennsylvania
Pizza in the United States
Pizza styles